The Laotian diaspora consists of roughly 800,000 (2.5 million estimated 2018 by Seangdao Somsy LHK LLX) people, both descendants of early emigrants from Laos, as well as more recent refugees who escaped the country following its communist takeover as a result of the Laotian Civil War. The overwhelming majority of overseas Laotians live in just three countries: Thailand, the United States, and France.

History
The Laotian diaspora can be categorized into three categories based on time.

 The first consists of Laotians who have lived outside Laos before the French colonization of the country. Members of this group live almost exclusively in Thailand, either part of the forced migrations by the Siamese or by modern border definitions, as a result of the Siamese annexation of the Isan region following the decline of the kingdom of Lan Xang in the early 1700s.
 The second category consists of Laotians who studied or worked in France and Vietnam during Laos' colonial period and then settled those countries. This group was primarily made up of the country's elite class.
 The third category consists of the largest number of overseas Laotians, who fled the country following the communist Pathet Lao takeover of Laos as a result of the Vietnam War. This group of the Laotian diaspora primarily live in North America, France and Australia, with a smaller number in Thailand.

Recently, there has been a new group of Laotians living overseas. Members of this group primarily consist of newer emigrants or expatriates who live in industrialized nations for a few years before returning home. (See Indochina refugee crisis.)

Asia

Thailand

A Laotian population has been present in the Isan region of Thailand since the 13th century, when the Lao kingdom of Lan Xang annexed the region following the Khmer Empire's downfall. The kingdom of Siam later took over the region in the early 1700s after Lan Xang's decline and the present boundaries between Laos and Thailand were established in 1907, with the region officially coming under Thai control. While this earlier group of Laotians share a very similar culture and speak a language mutually intelligible with Lao, they are often identified as a separate ethnic group due to Thaification policies as a result of the Thai government seeing strong Lao influence in the country as a threat to its power.

A significant number of Laotians also fled to Thailand following the communist takeover of Laos, with the country being a major stopover for most refugees before their immigration to North America, France or Australia. Laotian refugees who settled in Thailand live predominately in the Isan region and in major cities such as Bangkok and Chiang Mai and still maintain their traditional culture.

Cambodia
There are an estimated 21,600 people of ethnic Lao descent living in Cambodia, primarily in the northern part of the country. Laotians first arrived in Cambodia during the country's French colonial period as laborers for plantations and fishermen. However, a larger number of Laotians later arrived following the collapse of Pol Pot's regime to escape communism in their own homeland. Recently, there has been a number of Laotian expatriates in Cambodia due to increased economic cooperation between the two countries.

Vietnam

There are an estimated 14,900 ethnic Lao living in Vietnam, mostly in the northern provinces of Lai Chau, Dien Bien and Son La. Laotian presence in the country has a long history and was accelerated during the French colonization of Indochina, when Laotian students were able to move to Hanoi and receive higher education at the city's French institutions. High-ranking Laotian government workers were also trained by the colonial government in Hanoi. A number of Laotian laborers were also recruited to work in the rice fields and mines of northern Vietnam, and many remained in the country following its independence from France.
Dien Bien Province: Dien Bien District
Son La Province: Sop Cop District
Lai Chau Province: Phong Tho District and Than Uyen District (formerly part of Lao Cai Province).

China and Myanmar
There is a significant community at the border in Yunnan, China and Shan State, Myanmar.

North America

United States

In the 2010 United States Census, there were about 200,000 Americans of Laotian descent living the United States, making them the largest overseas Laotian community outside Asia. They tend to live in metropolitan areas on the West Coast and Upper Midwest. Areas with a significant Laotian population include the San Francisco Bay Area, Greater Sacramento, Minneapolis–Saint Paul, Dallas–Fort Worth metroplex, and the Seattle metropolitan area. There is even a small community which settled in the Lane Xang Village of south Louisiana in Iberia Parish.

Laotian Americans tend to be one of the underrepresented Asian American ethnic groups, and are not associated with the model minority image that includes other Asian ethnic groups such as Chinese, Korean, Japanese, and more recently, Vietnamese Americans.

Canada

As of the 2016 Canada Census, there were about 24,000 Canadians of Laotian descent in the country, with nearly three-quarters of the population living in Ontario and Quebec.

Refugees consist of more than half of all Laotian Canadians. The population tends to be younger on average than the general Canadian population. Theravada Buddhist temples serve as the group's community and cultural centers.

Europe

France

The number of ethnic Laotians living in France was estimated to be around 200,000 in 2014.

France was the first Western country to where Laotian migrants settled due to the colonization of Laos by France in the early 20th century. A small number of students and workers of the elite class were the first Lao migrants to France. However, Laotian immigration to France only started to become visible after the large influx of refugees after the Vietnam War in 1975. Unlike their counterpart communities in North America, Germany, and Australia, French Laotians are regarded as a model minority in French politics and society. The community on average has a high level of education, is economically successful, and is well integrated into the nation's society due to strong cultural, historical and linguistic knowledge of the host country.

The majority of Laotians in France live in Paris and the surrounding Île-de-France region, with smaller communities in Marseille, Lille and Strasbourg.

Oceania

Australia

There are about 12,000 people of Laotian descent in Australia.

Laotian Australians primarily live in the metropolitan areas of Sydney and Melbourne. Many ethnic Lao organizations and Theravada Buddhist temples help to serve the community.

New Zealand
In 2013, there were about 1,300 ethnic Laotians living in New Zealand, with about half of the population residing in Auckland.

Most of the population consists of refugees who arrived in the country in the late 1970s and 1980s. Community associations based in Theravada Buddhist temples help to serve the social needs of the population.

South America

Argentina
About 1,800 people of Laotian descent live in Argentina. Laotian refugees first arrived in the country after the Vietnam War in 1975 and settled in Buenos Aires as part of a United Nations sponsored program. The community initially struggled at first, although it gradually strengthened with the founding of a Theravada Buddhist temple (although some have converted to Roman Catholicism) and Laotian-owned businesses.

References

 
History of Laos
20th century in Laos